is a Japanese former gymnast who competed in the 1988 Summer Olympics.

References

External links 
 

1963 births
Living people
Japanese male artistic gymnasts
Olympic gymnasts of Japan
Gymnasts at the 1988 Summer Olympics
Olympic bronze medalists for Japan
Olympic medalists in gymnastics
Asian Games medalists in gymnastics
Gymnasts at the 1986 Asian Games
Medalists at the 1988 Summer Olympics
Asian Games bronze medalists for Japan
Medalists at the 1986 Asian Games
20th-century Japanese people
21st-century Japanese people